Deh Gusheh (also Romanized as Deh Gūsheh) is a village in Soghan Rural District, Soghan District, Arzuiyeh County, Kerman Province, Iran. At the 2006 census, its population was 186, in 34 families.

References 

Populated places in Arzuiyeh County